The Mealy Mountains is a mountain range in the southern portion of Labrador in the Canadian province of Newfoundland and Labrador. The mountains lie south of Lake Melville and cover an area of approximately 26,495 km² (10,231 mi²).

The Mealy Mountains encompass five of Labrador's ten provincial ecoregions, including coastal barrens, high sub arctic tundra, high boreal forest, mid boreal forest, and string bog.

National Park
A significant portion of the mountain range and surrounding area was designated a potential National Park Reserve in 2015: the Mealy Mountains National Park Reserve, a move which follows lobbying for the preservation of the area since the early 1970s. The governments of Canada (Parks Canada) and Newfoundland and Labrador (Ministry of Environment and Conservation) have agreed to pursue creation of a National Park Reserve, which would see the area managed as if it were a national park, pending settlement of Native land claims. Once settled, the area would likely be designated a national park, comprising approximately 20,000 km².

References

External links
Canadian Parks and Wilderness Society
First ski descents of the Mealy Mountains

Labrador
Mountain ranges of Newfoundland and Labrador
One-thousanders of Newfoundland and Labrador